Shahana Hajiyeva (born 6 July 2000) is an Azerbaijani Paralympic judoka. She won the gold medal in the women's 48 kg event at the 2020 Summer Paralympics held in Tokyo, Japan.

References 

Living people
2000 births
Azerbaijani female judoka
Paralympic judoka of Azerbaijan
Paralympic gold medalists for Azerbaijan
Paralympic medalists in judo
Judoka at the 2020 Summer Paralympics
Medalists at the 2020 Summer Paralympics
Place of birth missing (living people)
21st-century Azerbaijani women